Erna Steuri (22 April 1917 – 25 November 2001) was a Swiss alpine skier who competed in the 1936 Winter Olympics.

She was born in Grindelwald. In 1936 she finished fourth in the alpine skiing combined event.

References

External links
Alpine skiing 1936 
Erna Steuri's profile at Sports Reference.com

1917 births
2001 deaths
Swiss female alpine skiers
Olympic alpine skiers of Switzerland
Alpine skiers at the 1936 Winter Olympics
People from Grindelwald
Sportspeople from the canton of Bern
20th-century Swiss women